Kynaston is an English hamlet in the parish of Kinnerley, Shropshire.

It was described in 1870 as "KYNASTONE, a township in Kinnerley parish, Salop; 7½ miles SE of Oswestry. Pop., 135."

The name is thought to be derived from the conflation of the name Cynfyn and the Anglo Saxon term "aston", meaning east town. The place name appears in the 1086 Domesday Book in the spelling of 'Chimerstun', and it has been suggested that this translates as 'The place in the hollow'.

This Kynaston pre-dates the village in Herefordshire also called Kynaston.

The name is intimately linked with the Kynaston family, the first to carry the surname being Gruffydd Kynaston of Cae Howel, a settlement in the locality. It is not clear whether the hamlet was named after the family or vica versa.

References

External links

Villages in Shropshire